The Kooskia Internment Camp is a former internment camp in the northwest United States, located in north central Idaho, about  northeast of Kooskia in northern Idaho County. It operated during the final two years of World War II.

Originally a remote highway work camp (F-38) of the Civilian Conservation Corps  it became Federal Prison Camp No. 11 in 1935, run by the Federal Bureau of Prisons.

World War II
During World War II in 1943, it was converted to house more than 250 interned Japanese men, most of whom were longtime U.S. residents, but not citizens, branded "enemy aliens."

Because the camp was so remote in the western  fences and guard towers were  It was run by the Immigration and Naturalization Service (INS) of the Department of Justice.

The government put the internees to labor work to construct the Lewis and Clark highway, where they were paid about fifty to sixty dollars   volunteered from other camps to earn

Location
The mouth of Canyon Creek is just below milepost 104 of US 12.

Notable internees 
 Toraichi Kono

After the war

Originally labeled State Route 9, it was approved as US 12 in Idaho in June 1962. Its extension westward from Lewiston through Washington to Aberdeen was approved in 1967, taking over much of US 410, which was decommissioned.

See also
Minidoka War Relocation Center, in south central Idaho

References

External links
University of Idaho Library – The Kooskia, Idaho, Japanese Internment Camp, 1943-1945
Scrapbook – digital images
Federal Highway Administration – U.S. 12: Michigan to Washington

Internment camps for Japanese Americans